Red Hot Leather is a 1926 American silent Western film directed by Albert S. Rogell and starring Jack Hoxie, Ena Gregory, and Billy Engle.

Cast

Preservation
A partial print of Red Hot Leather with 4 reels is held by Gosfilmofond of Russia.

References

Bibliography
 Munden, Kenneth White. The American Film Institute Catalog of Motion Pictures Produced in the United States, Part 1. University of California Press, 1997.

External links

 

1926 films
1926 Western (genre) films
1920s English-language films
Universal Pictures films
Films directed by Albert S. Rogell
American black-and-white films
Silent American Western (genre) films
1920s American films